Gottschalkenberg Pass (el. 1164 m.) is a high mountain pass in the canton of Zug in Switzerland.

See also
 List of highest paved roads in Europe
 List of mountain passes
List of the highest Swiss passes

Mountain passes of the canton of Zug